The Men's Artistic Team All-Around at the 2013 Summer Universiade was both the qualification round and the team final for the competition. It served as the basis by which the team ranks were decided and the basis upon which gymnasts qualified for all-around and event finals. The first subdivision took place at 10:00 MSK, the second at 11:40 MSK, the third at 15:00 MSK, the fourth at 16:40 MSK, and the fifth at 18:20 MSK. The award ceremony for the team title was at 20:00 MSK.

Subdivisions
Gymnasts from nations taking part in the team all-around event were grouped together while the other gymnasts were grouped together into one of five mixed groups.

Subdivision 1: Mixed

Subdivision 2

Subdivision 3

Subdivision 4

Subdivision 5

Qualification and Team Final Results

References

Men's artistic team all-around